How and Why Wonder Books were a series of illustrated American books published in the 1960s and 1970s that was designed to teach science and history to children and young teenagers. The series began in 1960, and was edited under the supervision of Dr. Paul E. Blackwood of the Office of Education at the U.S. Department of Health, Education and Welfare. The series was published by Wonder Books, Inc., a division of Grosset & Dunlap.

Listing
There were 74 unique titles in the series, each one starting with the phrase The How and Why Wonder Book of… as a key component of the book's name. All 74 volumes were published in a softcover format, with pages measuring 8 × 11 inches (21.6 × 27.9 cm) in size. A number of the titles were also produced in hardcover versions, too; these being referred to as either the "Trade Editions" or the "Library Editions." Each How and Why Wonder Book uniformly contained a total of 48 pages, with the only exception being The Environment and You, which contained 64 pages.

The softcover books were numbered consecutively in series starting at 5001 (with the only exception being the final book in the series entitled Fossils). The hardcover versions were numbered differently from the softcover issues.

  5001  Dinosaurs
  5002  Weather
  5003  Electricity
  5004  Rocks and Minerals
  5005  Rockets and Missiles
  5006  Stars
  5007  Insects
  5008  Reptiles and Amphibians
  5009  Birds
  5010  Our Earth
  5011  Beginning Science
  5012  Machines
  5013  The Human Body
  5014  Sea Shells
  5015  Atomic Energy
  5016  The Microscope
  5017  The Civil War
  5018  Mathematics
  5019  Flight
  5020  Ballet
  5021  Chemistry
  5022  Horses
  5023  Explorations and Discoveries
  5024  Primitive Man
  5025  North America
  5026  Planets and Interplanetary Travel
  5027  Wild Animals
  5028  Sound
  5029  Lost Cities
  5030  Ants and Bees
  5031  Wild Flowers
  5032  Dogs
  5033  Prehistoric Mammals
  5034  Science Experiments
  5035  World War II
  5036  Florence Nightingale
  5037  Butterflies and Moths
  5038  Fish
  5039  Robots and Electronic Brains
  5040  Light and Color
  5041  Winning of the West
  5042  The American Revolution
  5043  Caves to Skyscrapers
  5044  Ships
  5045  Time
  5046  Magnets and Magnetism
  5047  Guns
  5048  The Moon
  5049  Famous Scientists
  5050  The Old Testament
  5051  Building
  5052  Railroads
  5053  Trees
  5054  Oceanography
  5055  North American Indians
  5056  Mushrooms, Ferns and Mosses
  5057  The Polar Regions
  5058  Coins and Currency
  5059  Basic Inventions
  5060  The First World War
  5061  Electronics
  5062  Deserts
  5063  Air and Water
  5064  Stars
  5065  Airplanes and the Story of Flight
  5066  Fish
  5067  Boats and Ships
  5068  The Moon
  5069  Trains and Railroads
  5070  Ecology
  5071  The Environment and You
  5072  Extinct Animals
  5073  Snakes
  5076  Fossils

When publication of the How and Why Wonder Book series first commenced in 1960, only the initial six titles in the series were produced. As time went by, and as the series proved to be highly successful, more new titles were added to expand its scope.

At the same time, a handful of titles also disappeared from the comprehensive "checklists" (located on back covers) when these volumes were revised and republished under a different title and/or series number. Specifically, there were six titles that were removed from checklists when they were reissued with a later series number. They were:

  5006 Stars (reissued as 5064 Stars)
  5019 Flight (reissued as 5065 Airplanes and the Story of Flight)
  5038 Fish (reissued as 5066 Fish)
  5044 Ships (reissued as 5067 Boats and Ships)
  5048 The Moon (reissued as 5068 The Moon)
  5052 Railroads (reissued as 5069 Trains and Railroads)

Although some of the titles were not altered from earlier versions, both the cover artwork and the interior content were changed. Thus, it is easy to distinguish between the early versions and the latter issues by the cover art alone.

The first 69 books in the series were issued with beautifully illustrated cover art, otherwise referred to as Painted Covers, during the 1960s. Later reprints in the 1970s, however, switched to Photo Covers. In fact, four of the last five volumes in the series were only produced in a photo cover version (Ecology, Extinct Animals, Snakes, and Fossils). Strangely enough, one of the final five titles (The Environment and You) was only issued in a painted cover, even though it was not released until the 1970s.

Because of the striking cover artwork, and thanks largely to the nostalgic appeal of these books, they have become collectable items once more today.

The mystery of the missing series numbers 
A mystery for collectors is the absence of How and Why Wonder Book volumes numbered 5074 or 5075. While it may well have been the original intent of publishers to fill in these missing gaps in the series sequence, this was never done. With the advent of the ISBN numbering system, the 5075 number was eventually assigned to a 1985 hardcover reprint of Earl Schenck Miers book America and Its Presidents. The ISBN number associated with number 5074 has never been assigned.

Price Stern Sloan How and Why Editions
Price Stern Sloan took over the publication of the How and Why series and released many of the existing titles with new covers.  In addition they added some new titles to the list:

  Space
  Solar System
  Living Things
  Planet Earth
  Motorcycles
  Automobiles
  Ships and Submarines
  Robots
  Radiation
  Aircraft

The first four of these had the series name How and Why Wonder Books above the title; the remainder reverted to the original The How and Why Wonder Book of... formulation.

How and Why Activity Books
Price Stern Sloan also released a matching series of activity books that contained mazes, puzzles and games about the subject they contained.  Titles released in this series were:

  Beginning Science
  Cats
  Dinosaurs
  The Earth
  Four Famous Dinosaurs
  Human Body
  Insects
  Prehistoric Animals
  Reptiles
  Rocks and Minerals
  Sharks
  Space
  Wild Animals
  Wild Animals of North America

The UK Series
During the 1960s and 1970s, the How and Why Wonder Book series was concurrently published in the United Kingdom by Transworld Publishers of London. For the most part, both the cover artwork and the inner content of the UK volumes were identical to those of the U.S. publications.  However, a handful of the UK versions contained either revised text and/or unique cover art. Many of these revisions were done to reflect European species (Birds, Insects) or to emphasize regional conditions.

The UK series was published using a completely different numbering sequence from the U.S. series (Dinosaurs is number 6501, Stars is 6503, etc.). Also, the UK version of Extinct Animals has a painted cover as opposed to the U.S. version's photo cover.

The following standard series titles were released in the UK by Transworld Publishers. Unless otherwise indicated, both the content and cover art used were identical to those of the American versions:

6501  Dinosaurs
6502  Weather	
6503  Stars
6504  The Human Body
6505  Chemistry
6506  Horses
6507  Planets and Interplanetary Travel
6508  Wild Animals
6509  Lost Cities
6510  Dogs
6511  Fish
6512  Caves to Skyscrapers
6513  Our Earth
6514  The First World War (different cover art from US version)
6515  Explorations and Discoveries (different cover from later US softcover, but same as US hardcover and initial US softcover)
6516  Mathematics
6517  Primitive Man
6518  Science Experiments
6519  The Microscope
6520  Flight
6521  Prehistoric Mammals
6522  Atomic Energy
6523  Robots and Electronic Brains
6524  Ballet
6525  Electricity
6526  Machines
6527  Sound
6528  Ants and Bees
6529  Light and Colour
6530  Reptiles
6531  Rocks and Minerals
6532  Beginning Science
6533  Famous Scientists
6534  The Polar Regions
6535  North American Indians
6536  The Lady of the Lamp (identical to US Florence Nightingale version, but unique title)
6537  Winning of the West
6538  Time
6539  Basic Inventions
6540  Magnets and Magnetism
6541  Old Testament
6542  Oceanography
6543  Building
6544  Deserts
6548  Rocks and Minerals (Revised Edition of #6531)
6550  Electronics
6551  Air and Water
6552  Railways  (new text and cover art as compared to US Railroads edition)
6553  Birds (revised text and unique cover art)
6554  Coins (new text and cover art as compared to US Coins and Currency edition)
6555  Extinct Animals (was UK release first, subsequently released in US with different cover)
6557  World War II (revised text and unique cover art)
6561  Wild Flowers (revised text and unique cover art)
6562  Trees (unique cover art)
6564  Fossils (was UK release first, subsequently released in US with different cover)
6568  Butterflies and Moths (revised text and unique cover art)
6571  Insects (revised text and unique cover art)
6572  Robots and Electronic Brains (Revised Edition of #6523)
6575  Electronics (Revised Edition of #6550)
6579  Ships (unique cover art)
6580  Dogs (Revised Edition of #6510)
6581  Beginning Science (Revised Edition of #6532)
6585  Snakes
6586  Planets and Interplanetary Travel (Revised Edition of #6507)	
6592  Weather (same cover image as U.S. edition, but revised content to #6502)
6595  Deserts (Same content as US edition but unique cover as compared to #6544)

In addition to the foregoing, Transworld expanded the UK series with the release of the following new, unique titles:

6545	The Tower of London	
6546	Stamps
6547	Seashore	
6549	Castles	
6556	The Spoilt Earth	
6558	Communications	
6559	Dance
6560	Kings and Queens	
6563	Photography
6565	Ancient Rome
6566   Common Market	
6567	Volcanoes
6569	Vikings	
6570	Cats	
6573   Costume
6574	The Crusades	
6576	The Motor Car
6577	Energy and Power Sources
6578	Radio and TV
6583	Heraldry
6587	Deep Sea
6589	Pets	
6591	Arms and Armour
6596   Rare Animals	
6597	Ancient Egypt
6598	Oil
6599   Parliament
6600	The Ice Age	
6601	Arab World

Early editions of the UK volumes had a "checklist" on their back covers, similar to American copies. This format was used up until #6536 (Lady of the Lamp); released in 1967.  However, soon thereafter, the format of the back cover was revised to show a photo of a random selection of some of the volumes available in the series.

In addition, Transworld published two How and Why BUMPER WONDER Books which were "puzzles, quizzes, jokes, amazing facts" using content and images from the various How and Why editions.
  
 Bumper Wonder Book #1 (#6584)
 Bumper Wonder Book #2 (#6593)

One feature of most UK editions of the How and Why books was that the back inner cover featured an advertisement for a "Collector's Binder" to hold your How and Why books.  The ad read "The new How and Why collector binder holds 12 titles; a wonderful way to build your own reference library!  It is available from the publishers of the How and Why books for only 16/-.  Supplies are limited so send for yours now."  This back inner cover advertisement was a standard feature for many years.

It also appears that four of the ISBN series numbers contained within the sequential Transworld numbering block were never assigned to volumes within the How and Why Wonder book series; these being volumes #6582, #6588, #6590 and #6594. An ISBN search of these numbers indicates that they were never assigned to published volumes.

Although the above lists are comprehensive for How and Why Wonder Book volumes published by Grosset & Dunlap and Transworld in the 1960s and 1970s, certain volumes in the series continued to be published by Price Stern Sloan into the 1980s and that additional unique titles were added to the series. New How and Why Wonder Book titles included Radiation, Ships and Submarines, Planet Earth, Living Things, Automobiles, Motorcycles, Space, Robots, Aircraft, and the Solar System. None of these titles was available earlier than 1987 and thus they do not appear in the foregoing checklists.

Dutch translations

Dutch translations of the American originals were published, originally in softcover and later in hardcover, by Zuid-Nederlandse Uitgeverij at Deurne, Belgium under the titles "HOE EN WAAROM" or "Het HOE EN WAAROM boek van".

German translations
German translations were published from 1961, originally in softcover and later in hardcover, by Tessloff Verlag, Hamburg, Germany, under the title "Was ist was". The edition was fairly successful and produced audio CDs and DVDs later on.

Writers, illustrators and photographers
Many individuals contributed to the How and Why Wonder Book series. They consisted of a wide spectrum of authors, artists and photographers. Some of these individuals contributed to several volumes in the How and Why Wonder Book series, while many others appeared on a one-time basis only. A partial listing of many of the individuals that contributed to the series is outlined below.

Writers: Darlene Geis, George Bonsall, Jerome J. Notkin, Sidney Gulkin, Nelson W. Hyler, Clayton Knight, Norman Hoss, Ronald Rood, Robert Mathewson, Felix Sutton, Martin L. Keen, Donald F. Low, Donald Barr, Earl Schenck Miers, Esther Harris Highland, Harold Joseph Highland, Lee Wyndham, Margaret Cabell Self, Irving Robbin, Grace F. Ferguson, Robert Scharff, Gene Liberty, Jean Bethell, Dr. Gilbert Klaperman, Geoffrey Coe, Amy Elizabeth Jensen, Dr. Paul J. Gelinas, Clare Cooper Cunniff, Shelly Grossman, Mary Louise Grossman, Matthew J. Brennan and Georg Zappler.

Illustrators and photographers: - Kenyon Shannon, George Pay, Robert Patterson, Charles Bernard, James Ponter, Cynthia Koehler, Alvin Koehler, Darrell Sweet, Douglas Allen, Ned Smith, Walter Ferguson, John Hull, George J. Zaffo, William Fraccio, Tony Tallarico, Leonard Vosburgh, Rafaello Busoni, Matthew Kalmenoff, Denny McMains, William Barss, Robert Doremus, Shannon Stirnweis, Shelly Grossman, Dougal MacDougal and John Barber.

Spotlight Wonder Books and the 7900 Series
Closely associated with the How and Why Wonder Book series are two other series of softcover books produced by publisher Grosset and Dunlap in the 1960s under the Wonder Books banner. They are the Spotlight Wonder Book series and the otherwise nameless "7900" series.

Spotlight Wonder Books
The Spotlight Wonder Book series focused on famous people or institutions as opposed to science topics. They were identical to How and Why Wonder Books in terms of their size (8 × 11 inches, or 21.6 × 27.9 cm) and the fact that they also contained the standard 48 pages. Titles included the following:

  6900 The Story of John F. Kennedy
  6901 Into Space with the Astronauts
  6902 The Story of Winston Churchill
  6903 The White House and the Presidency
  6904 The Capitol and Our Lawmakers
  6905 The Story of the American Negro
  6906 The Story of the F.B.I.
  6907 The Story of Pope John XXIII

The 7900 Series
Similar in size and style to How and Why Wonder Books and Spotlight Wonder Books, the 7900 series pertained to television personalities/programs or fictional characters. Titles included:

  7900 Portrait of Skipper
  7901 Monsters
  7902 Bewitched
  7903 The Man from U.N.C.L.E.
  7904 Soupy Sales

Conquest of the Moon
In 1969 Wonder Books/Grosset and Dunlap published Conquest of the Moon, a 64-page book in the same format as a How and Why Wonder Book consisting of revised content from #5048 The Moon and expanded to include the story of the Apollo 11 moon landing mission.

See also

 List of English language book publishing companies
 List of largest UK book publishers
 Saalfield Science Series

References

External links
 How and Why Wonder Books at rocketroberts.com/
 "How and Why Wonder Books" 69 of 70 = 98%"
 Books at Transworld
 The How and Why Wonder Books at barbarastew-art.com
 The "How and Why Wonder Book" Series by Grosset and Dunlap at collectorville.net

Children's non-fiction books
Series of non-fiction books
Series of children's books
American children's books
Grosset & Dunlap books